St. Hovhannes Church was an Armenian church located in village of Tumbul of the Nakhchivan Autonomous Republic of Azerbaijan. The church was located in the center of the village.

History 
The church was founded in the 16th or 17th century and was renovated in the 19th century. In 1868, a bilingual Armenian and Russian school was opened in the church. The church had already been a target of destruction in the late Soviet period; the western, northern, and southern walls of the church were completely razed to the ground, but the two-storied bell tower was still standing. By March 12, 2005, whatever was remaining from the church had been razed and the vacant plot walled off for reuse as a garden.

References 

Armenian churches in Azerbaijan
Ruins in Azerbaijan
Armenian churches